

Incumbents 

 President: Gitanas Nausėda
 Prime Minister: Ingrida Šimonytė

Events 
 Ongoing: 2021–2023 Belarus–European Union border crisis, COVID-19 pandemic in Lithuania

  January 18 – Lithuanian government renounced the agreement signed with Belarus on the principles of cross-border cooperation. The bill terminated the agreement signed by the governments of Lithuania and Belarus in Vilnius on June 1, 2006, to set out areas of cross-border cooperation between the two neighbouring countries, as a response to 2021–2023 Belarus–European Union border crisis.

Disasters and accidents 

 January 13: 2023 Lithuania–Latvia pipeline explosion: an explosion in Lithuania–Latvia Interconnection pipeline system by Pasvalio Vienkiemiai village, Pasvalys District Municipality. As a precaution the entire village of Valakėliai was evacuated.
 January 31: bridge partially collapsed in Kėdainiai downtown over Nevėžis river. Bridge connected the city with main intercity roads.
 February 14: a bridge construction that is part of A1 highway in Kaunas collapsed. No casualties reported.

National anniversaries 

Lithuanian parliament Seimas released the statement confirming the celebratory of following three national anniversaries in 2023:
 700 years anniversary of establishment of Vilnius
 100 years anniversary of reunification with Klaipėda
 400 years anniversary of Josaphat Kuntsevych's sacrifice.

Transport 
 January 2 – Lithuanian Railways stopped 3 direct train services Šiauliai–Panevėžys, Radviliškis–Mažeikiai and Radviliškis–Šiauliai. All 3 routes were replaced by Panevėžys–Šiauliai–Mažeikiai route, coursing 8 times a day and combining Radviliškis–Daugavpils Railway and Libau–Romny Railway infrastructure.
 February 16 – Lithuania stopped any cargo trade with Belarus via railway boarder point Stasylos-Bieniakoni, leaving only one railway cargo link between two countries in Kena-Hudahaj railway link point.
 February 20 – LTG Cargo (part of Lithuanian Railways group) decreased transit numbers of goods moving between Russia's mainland and Kaliningrad Oblast through Lithuania by 7%, limiting Russia to 2.89 tonnes of goods in 2023.
 February 26 – Lithuanian customs reinstated third party cargo check points at the Lithuania–Poland border, due increased cargo freight from non-EU countries via Poland and Lithuania to Belarus.

Environment 
 January 1 – new record set for warmest new year day in Lithuanian history with temperature rising to 14.9 C in Druskininkai municipality.
 January 5 – Minija river broke through flood wall and flooded Stragnai II village.
 January 14 – a sinkhole formed that was 17.2m in diameter in Užubaliai, Biržai District Municipality. It was the biggest sinkhole to appear in Lithuania within the last two decades.
 January 22 – oil spill from discontinued railway factory polluted Nemunas river in Kaunas. Pollution stopped the following day.
 January 30 – Nevėžis river flooded Justinava village.
 March 4 – due strong winds record breaking 717 MW of wind electricity generated in Lithuania at the same time, setting a new record.

Law and crime 
 January 1 – new restriction come into action preventing minors under 18 years old to participate in any form of lottery. Minors caught buying a lottery ticket would be issued with the fine up to 440 euros, while service provider selling lottery tickets to minors could be issued with up to 3000 euros fine.
 January 1 – changes in maternity and paternity time-off law came into action. The time off law was changed from 12-24 months to 18-24 months, the government pay-outs changed to direct pays of 100.54% based on parent's direct salary, single parents gained increased pay-outs.
 January 31 – three homemade bombs was detected in Vilnius Levas Karsavinas school. All students and teachers evacuated, while special forces inspected the bombs.

Administrative changes 
 January 1 – Žaliūkės village transferred from Šiauliai District Municipality to Šiauliai City municipality.

Politics 
 January 13: Freedom Award by Seimas awarded to Ukrainian president Volodymyr Zelenskyy, presentation held in National Parliament.
 January 23: Kristijonas Bartoševičius withdrew his membership in the national parliament Seimas. On February 1, the official investigation started for allegations of paedophilia against Bartoševičius.
 February 7: National Freedom Scholarship awarded to philosopher Vilius Bartninkas.
 March 2: Politcial party of Russian Alliance in Lithuania was disestablished due rules violation after party failed to present list of party members three rounds in a row. In addition 3 other parties was disestablished by submitting official request: Party of Political Prisoners, Nations Solidarity Union, Order and Justice.
 March 5: Municipality elections took place in Lithuania with Social Democratic Party of Lithuania and Homeland Union winning the most seats in local municipalities.

Sports 
 February 5–12 : 2023 Vitas Gerulaitis Cup
 February 15: Lazdynai Swimming Pool officially opened in Vilnius, Lithuania. Upon completion it is the biggest swimming sports arena in Lithuania and the Baltic states.
 March 19–25: 2023 FAI F3P World Championships
 May 19–21: 2023 EuroLeague Final Four
 26 July – 5 August: 2023 World Glider Aerobatics Championships
 27 August – 3 September: 2023 470 Junior World Championships
 12–17 September: 2023 World Junior Modern Pentathlon Championships

Deaths 

 January 16 – Vladas Česiūnas, 82, sprint canoeist, Olympic champion (1972).
 January 18 – Marius Zibolis, 48, goalball player, Paralympic silver medallist (2000, 2008).
 January 20 – Grigorijus Kanovičius, 93, writer
 February 15 – Algimantas Žižiūnas, 83, photographer.

References 

 
2020s in Lithuania
Years of the 21st century in Lithuania
Lithuania
Lithuania